Evergreen is an unincorporated community and census-designated place (CDP) in Tatums Township, Columbus County, North Carolina, United States. The population was 420 at the 2010 census.

Geography
Evergreen is located near the northwestern edge of Columbus County and is bordered to the northwest by the town of Boardman. U.S. Route 74, a four-lane highway, forms the southern edge of the CDP and leads northwest  to Interstate 95 near Lumberton and southeast  to Whiteville, the Columbus County seat.

Demographics

References

Unincorporated communities in North Carolina
Census-designated places in Columbus County, North Carolina
Census-designated places in North Carolina
Unincorporated communities in Columbus County, North Carolina